Süleyman Seba (5 April 1926 – 13 August 2014) was a Turkish football player of Abkhazian origin and was the longest presiding Chairman of the Istanbul based multisports club Beşiktaş J.K. He was also an intelligence officer for National Intelligence Organization (Turkey) in the mission of countering communism.

Biography

Early life 

Süleyman Seba (Abkhaz name Tsiba) was born on 5 April 1926 in Soğuksulu, a village in the Sakarya Province of Turkey. Seba family moved to Akaretler district in Beşiktaş, Istanbul when Süleyman Seba was 5 or 6 years old. Although most sources say that Seba attended the prestigious Galatasaray High School in the Beyoğlu district for a while, some other sources say that this was just a plan. After finishing elementary school in Beşiktaş in 1938, Seba went to Kabataş High School on the Bosphorus, another prestigious historic Turkish high school, in the Beşiktaş district. He selected this school due to its proximity to the training fields of the local football club Beşiktaş J.K.

Seba later enrolled in Mimar Sinan University's Faculty of Literature to study French philology, but because of his football career he never graduated. He also tried to obtain a degree in geography but he couldn't attend the exams when Beşiktaş J.K. was invited to play some friendlies in the United States.

Football player 

Seba started to play football in the Kabataş High School team. The promising player was soon discovered by the local football club Beşiktaş J.K. and admitted to its junior team. With his contribution, the junior team became the champions of that season, and Seba was promoted to the rank of team captain a short time later. In 1946, he was called to become a member of the A-team.

Seba scored 19 Istanbul Football League goals in 70 matches between 1946 and 1953. He also played in 17 Milli Küme Şampiyonası matches and scored 3 goals. He won one Turkish title at the end of his first professional season for Beşiktaş in 1947. He also won 3 Istanbul titles. In 1950, Süleyman Seba joined the Beşiktaş J.K. squad that went to the USA to play some friendly matches. They played against American Soccer League all-stars, some regional all-star teams, and Manchester United. It is rumoured that Manchester United wanted to transfer Seba after the match.

Seba went down in Turkish football history when he scored the first ever goal in BJK İnönü Stadium against the Swedish side Allmänna Idrottsklubben during the inauguration match of the venue in 1947. The match was played as the first match of AIK's tour in Turkey. Seba scored the first goal in the stadium on the 40th minute. In one of his last interviews, he narrated the goal saying: "Faruk [Sağnak] kicked the ball from the left side to me. Then, I stopped the ball. Presumably, I faked two footballers and I scored the goal like that". AIK won that match 3-2.

In 1954, he was forced to retire from his career as a footballer due to a meniscus injury. During his entire professional career he played only for Beşiktaş J.K.

International career 

Seba was never called up to the Turkish national squad; however, he was given the opportunity to play for Turkey national under-21 football team. Initially, Turkish Football Federation gave Beşiktaş J.K. (then-champions of Istanbul Football League) the permission to represent the Turkish side in the Turkey's last match in the East Mediterranean Cup 1950-1953 against Greece national football team. Although the squad was strengthened by some additions from Galatasaray and Fenerbahçe S.K., Beşiktaş J.K. obtained the right to use the Turkish flag in their emblem, and it is still being used by the club today.

Süleyman Seba was among the players who were selected to play against Greece. On 16 May 1952, he played his first and only game where Turkey lost 0-1.

Career after retiring from football 

There is not much information on Seba's years after retiring from active sports. However, it is known that he served for some time in the Turkish National Intelligence Organization (MIT) and rose to the rank of colonel.

Club president 

In 1957, Seba became an active member of Beşiktaş J.K.

Six years later, in 1963, he became a member of the club's Presidential Council.

In 1984 Seba took the helm of the club, gaining more votes in the presidential election than Mehmet Üstünkaya who was the club president between 1981–1984. The election was held on April 1, 1984. Seba got the support of 403 members whereas Üstünkaya obtained the support of 338 members. During this election Seba received the support of the all-time Beşiktaş legend "Baba" (Father) Hakkı Yeten.

In his first full season he signed Branko Stanković as the new manager of the team, tried to solve the debt issues of the clubs, and started to invest in club's facilities. Beşiktaş lost the league championship on goal difference but Seba decided to continue with Stanković. In January 1986, Beşiktaş won the Fleet Cup, which was the first official trophy that was won during the Seba presidency. On 23 February 1986, Seba was elected again and his second term started. At the end of 1985-86 season, Stanković's Beşiktaş won the Turkish Super League championship on goal difference. The championship was won for the first time in four years. Beşiktaş closed the season by winning the Presidential Cup as well.

During Seba's era, Beşiktaş became the dominant team in Turkey and in the 1986–1987 season reached the quarter-finals of the European Champion Clubs' Cup (known as the UEFA Champions League today) but lost to Dynamo Kyiv. When Seba brought British coach Gordon Milne, no one knew that Beşiktaş was set for years of dominance in the Turkish Super League. With a strong team of young players like "Atom Karınca" (Atom Ant) Rıza Çalımbay (team captain), Feyyaz Uçar, "Sarı Fırtına" (Blonde Storm) Metin Tekin, Ali Gültiken, Gökhan Keskin, Mehmet Özdilek and Sergen Yalçın, Beşiktaş won three League titles in a row between 1989–1992. Beşiktaş later became the League Champions in 1994–1995, but then went on for years to finish behind Fatih Terim's Galatasaray SK.

Seba went on for a 16-year presidency as club chairman of Beşiktaş J.K. He worked with several world famous trainers like Christoph Daum, John Benjamin Toshack, and Karl Heinz Feldkamp. In 1998, he was elected as the chairman one more time and he announced that this was going to his final term. He was elected as the honorary chairman in the next financial congress in February 2000. Although he declared his support for Hasan Arat in the next chairman elections, Serdar Bilgili was elected on 27 March 2000 and became his successor.

During his retirement, the honorary chairman Seba was one of the most respected figures of Beşiktaş J.K., which became a financially strong club thanks to his efforts – far stronger than the practically bankrupt club which he took over in 1984.

Death
Seba died on August 13, 2014. He was laid to rest at the Feriköy Cemetery, Istanbul.

Honours

The famous historic avenue in the Akaretler quarter of Beşiktaş, where the club's HQ is located, has been renamed as Süleyman Seba Avenue in his honour.

The 2014–15 season of the Süper Lig, which began less than a month after Seba's death, was officially dedicated to him by the Turkish Football Federation.

Trophies won by club during presidency 

Süper Lig (5):
1985–86, 1989–90, 1990–91, 1991–92, 1994–95
Turkish Cup (4):
1989, 1990, 1994, 1998
Turkish Presidents Cup (5)
1986, 1989, 1992, 1994, 1998
Chancellor Cup (2):
1988, 1997
Fleet Cup (1):
1986
TSYD Cup (6):
1985, 1989, 1990, 1991, 1994, 1997

See also
List of one-club men

References

Bibliography

External links
 Süleyman Seba at Beşiktaş J.K.
 Süleyman Seba at TFF

1926 births
People from Hendek
Turkish people of Abkhazian descent
Beşiktaş J.K. footballers
Beşiktaş J.K. presidents
People of the National Intelligence Organization (Turkey)
Kabataş Erkek Lisesi alumni
Galatasaray High School alumni
Istanbul University alumni
Turkey under-21 international footballers
2014 deaths
Burials at Feriköy Cemetery
Association football wingers
Turkish footballers